Caroline Clyde Holly (July 15, 1866 – July 13, 1943) was a U.S. politician in the state of Colorado.

Legislative career
Colorado became the first state in which women obtained the right to vote through popular election in 1893.  The following year, on November 6, 1894, three women were elected to serve in the Colorado House of Representatives. Besides Holly, they included Clara Cressingham and Frances S. Klock.  All three were Republicans and were sworn into office in 1895. Each served one term, from 1895 to 1896.

She was married to the associate justice of the Colorado Territorial Supreme Court Charles Frederick Holly.

References

Republican Party members of the Colorado House of Representatives
1866 births
1943 deaths
Women state legislators in Colorado
People from Pueblo, Colorado
19th-century American women politicians
19th-century American politicians
People from New York City